Jason Webber is an Australian former professional rugby league footballer who played in the 1990s and 2000s. He played for Balmain in the Australian Rugby League and NRL competitions.  Webber also played in England for Salford and in France for Villeneuve.

Background
Webber was born in Murgon, Queensland, Australia.

Playing career
Webber made his first grade debut for Balmain against the Gold Coast in Round 3 1997.  Webber would make 12 appearances and score 3 tries for the club as they missed out on the finals by 1 competition point.  Over the next 2 seasons, Webber would become a regular starter in the Balmain side at centre.  Webber played for Balmain in their final year as a stand-alone entity before merging with Western Suburbs to form the Wests Tigers.  Webber's final game for Balmain was in Round 22 1999 against Eastern Suburbs at Leichhardt Oval.

In 2000, Webber joined English side Salford and played one season for the club.  In 2002, Webber joined French side Villeneuve before returning to Australia in 2004 and signing with Burleigh.  Webber won the 2004 Queensland Cup with Burleigh before retiring.

Post playing
In 2017, Webber became the coach of the Murgon Mustangs.

References

1973 births
Living people
Australian rugby league players
Balmain Tigers players
Salford Red Devils players
Rugby league centres
Rugby league players from Queensland
Villeneuve Leopards players